Red Boy was a character featured in the 16th century novel Journey to the West. Red Boy was also known as the Boy Sage Great King (聖嬰大王), and was the son of Princess Iron Fan (a Rakshasa) and the Bull Demon King, a sworn brother of Sun Wukong from 500-years-earlier. Through the orders of his father, Red Boy was told to be the protector of the Fiery Mountains due to his supreme abilities when it came to fire, abilities he had cultivated for over 300 years.

Through this, Red Boy had developed True Samādhi Fire (三昧眞火, Pinyin: Sānmèi-zhēnhuǒ), which enables him to shoot fire inextinguishable by water and smoke from his eyes, nostrils and mouth. Samādhi is the Sanskrit word for concentration.

The 2021 film Journey to the West Red Boy (西游记红孩儿) features Red Boy as the main character. It depicts his life and relationship with Sun Wukong.

Part in Journey to the West
Red Boy (紅孩兒) is the ferocious son of the Bull Demon King and Princess Iron Fan (a Rakshasa). Upon hearing about Tang Sanzang's arrival to his mountain, he attempted to capture the monk so he can eat the latter's flesh and extend his lifespan. Although a young child, he is a fiercely independent kid who lived solitary life away from his parents, even reigning over lesser demons with his mighty power.

Red Boy tried to lure the travelers by disguising himself as an innocent boy tied to a tree; they kindly untie him, and Sun Wukong (who knows that he's a demon) has to carry him along the way until he prepares to kill him afterwards, but Red Boy tricks him and kidnaps Tang Sanzang.

Sun Wukong had battled against Red Boy in hopes of returning his master Tang Sanzang. Red Boy did not believe Wukong's statement that Red Boy's father (the Bull Demon King) was his sworn brother, which technically made Wukong a relative of his.

Red Boy then tried to kill Wukong by controlling five carts (each one representing one of the Five Elements) that emitted in great amount of fire that had the power to blot out the heavens, but Wukong cast a fire resistance spell and chased after Red Boy, who had gone back into his cave, thinking he had defeated Wukong.

Sun Wukong at first asks for some rain from the Eastern Dragon King to counter Red Boy's Samadhi Fire, to no avail (the Dragon King's rain can only extinguish normal fires, but Red Boy's fire is inextinguishable to normal efforts to quench fire) with the rain in fact intensifying the flames. Caught directly by the flames, Sun Wukong is ultimately almost burned to death and he finally resorts to asking for the help of the Bodhisattva Guanyin.

As Red Boy was fighting Wukong in a forest, he found Guanyin's (empty) lotus throne, and then in irreverence, sat in it, imitating Guanyin's posture. Suddenly the lotus throne transformed into swords, which pierced and wounded Red Boy; as he attempted to take them out, the swords then transformed into halberds, which trapped him. In pain, Red Boy then pleaded for Guanyin to release him. In return, Red Boy would have to also become Guanyin's permanent disciple, and was given the name 'Shancai' (善財).

She then withdrew the blades and healed Red Boy's wounds, but Red Boy then attempted to attack the Bodhisattva once more. She then threw a golden band which multiplied into five and fixed it around his head, wrists and legs (which were similar to the magical band around Wukong's head, in that it also tightened after Guanyin recited the mantra "oṃ maṇipadme hūṃ", causing pain to Red Boy), thereby subduing him.

Red Boy then found out that he could not remove these bands, and after being jibed by Wukong, took his spear and attempted to attack him, only to have Guanyin recite yet another mantra, which made Red Boy put his hands together in front of his chest, unable to pull them apart; Red Boy, now with his arms immobilized, could do nothing other than lower his head in a bow of defeat.

References

Journey to the West characters